Catazetema is a genus of moths belonging to the family Tineidae. It contains only one species, Catazetema trivialis, which is found in the Democratic Republic of the Congo.

References

Tineidae
Monotypic moth genera
Insects of the Democratic Republic of the Congo
Moths of Africa
Endemic fauna of the Democratic Republic of the Congo
Tineidae genera